The Hansom Cab is a Grade II listed public house at 84–86 Earls Court Road, Kensington, London W8 6EG. It is on the corner with Pembroke Square.

A hansom cab is a kind of horse-drawn carriage, as illustrated on the pub's sign.

References

External links
 

Grade II listed buildings in the Royal Borough of Kensington and Chelsea
Grade II listed pubs in London
Pubs in the Royal Borough of Kensington and Chelsea
Kensington